Robert Witherspoon Hemphill (May 10, 1915 – December 25, 1983) was a United States representative from South Carolina and later was a United States district judge of the United States District Court for the District of South Carolina.

Education and career

Born on May 10, 1915, in Chester, South Carolina, Hemphill attended the public schools. He graduated with an Artium Baccalaureus degree from the University of South Carolina in 1936 and with a Bachelor of Laws from the University of South Carolina School of Law in 1938. At the university, Hemphill was a member of the Euphradian Society. He was admitted to the bar in 1938 and commenced the practice of law in Chester until 1964. Hemphill volunteered in 1941 as a flying cadet in the United States Army Air Corps and served as a bomber pilot until December 1945. After returning from the war, he served as chairman of Chester County Democratic conventions in 1946 and 1947. He was elected to the South Carolina House of Representatives in 1946, serving from 1947 to 1948. He served as solicitor of the Sixth South Carolina Judicial Circuit from 1950 to 1956.

Congressional service

Hemphill was elected as a Democrat to the Eighty-fifth and to the three succeeding Congresses, serving from January 3, 1957, until his resignation May 1, 1964, to take a federal judicial post. During his Congressional service, he was a delegate to the North Atlantic Treaty Organization Congress in London in 1959.

Federal judicial service

Hemphill was nominated by President Lyndon B. Johnson on April 15, 1964, to a joint seat on the United States District Court for the Eastern District of South Carolina and the United States District Court for the Western District of South Carolina vacated by Judge George Bell Timmerman Sr. He was confirmed by the United States Senate on April 30, 1964, and received his commission on April 30, 1964. He served as Chief Judge of the Eastern District from 1964 to 1965. On November 1, 1965, the Eastern and Western Districts were recombined into a single United States District Court for the District of South Carolina. On that day, Hemphill was reassigned by operation of law to a new seat authorized by 79 Stat. 951. He served as Chief Judge from 1979 to 1980. He assumed senior status on May 10, 1980. His service terminated on December 25, 1983, due to his death in Chester. He was interred in Hopewell Associate Reformed Presbyterian Church Cemetery, in Chester.

Personal

Hemphill was the great-great-nephew of Senator John Hemphill, great-nephew of John J. Hemphill, great-nephew of William Huggins Brawley, and great-great-grandson of Robert Witherspoon.

References

Sources
 
 
 
Robert Witherspoon Hemphill Papers at South Carolina Political Collections at the University of South Carolina

1915 births
1983 deaths
Democratic Party members of the South Carolina House of Representatives
Judges of the United States District Court for the Western District of South Carolina
Judges of the United States District Court for the Eastern District of South Carolina
Judges of the United States District Court for the District of South Carolina
United States district court judges appointed by Lyndon B. Johnson
20th-century American judges
United States Army Air Forces officers
United States Army Air Forces pilots of World War II
Democratic Party members of the United States House of Representatives from South Carolina
20th-century American politicians